Caught Live! is a live album by American all-female heavy metal band Phantom Blue.

The set list consists mainly of songs from Built to Perform and Prime Cuts & Glazed Donuts. "Going Mad" is the only song from the band's self-titled debut album on the list. Also included is a cover of the Janis Joplin song "Move Over" and the previously unreleased song "Bleeding from Nowhere".

Track listing
 "Introduction" - 0:40
 "Anti-Love Crunch" (Linda McDonald, Karen Kreutzer, Gigi Hangach) - 3:03
 "Bad Reputation" (Brian Downey, Phil Lynott, Scott Gorham) - 2:49 (Thin Lizzy cover)
 "Little Man" (McDonald, Nicole Couch) - 3:31
 "Strange War" (McDonald, Kim Nielsen, Couch) - 4:01
 "In the Likes of You" (McDonald, Chris Haren) - 3:16
 "Move Over" (Janis Joplin) - 3:58 (Janis Joplin cover)
 "Satu Saju" (Jojo's Solo) - 2:29
 "Bleeding from Nowhere" (McDonald, Kreutzer, Hangach) - 3:56
 "Fairies Wear Boots" (Tony Iommi, Ozzy Osbourne, Geezer Butler, Bill Ward) - 4:54 (Black Sabbath cover)
 "Violin Song" (instrumental) - 2:04
 "Going Mad" (Couch) - 4:11
 "Gigi's Bogus Bonus Track" - 0:28

Personnel
Phantom Blue
Gigi Hangach – vocals
Josephine Soegijanty – guitar
Tina Wood – guitar
Dyna Shirasaki – bass guitar
Linda McDonald – drums

Additional musicians
Candace Mokhtarian - violin on "Violin Song"

Production
Chris Jacobson - producer, engineer
Eric Fahlborg - mastering
Mark Dawson - executive producer

References 

Phantom Blue albums
1997 live albums